The Coalition of Socialist Forces (CSF) (Arabic: تحالف القوى الاشتراكية) is a coalition of five socialist and left-wing groups in Egypt formed on 10 May 2011. The different forces agreed to enter into a "socialist front" in order "to create a more dominant leftist force" in post-revolutionary Egypt. As of 31 May 2011, the CSF is reported to have a combined membership of over 5,000 members.

Affiliate groups
 Egyptian Communist Party - Marxist-Leninist
 Socialist Popular Alliance Party - Democratic socialist
 Revolutionary Socialists - Trotskyist
 Socialist Party of Egypt - Democratic socialist
 Workers Democratic Party - Labourist

See also
 Popular front
 United front

References

2011 establishments in Egypt
Anti-Zionism in Egypt
Far-left politics
Left-wing political party alliances
Organisations of the Egyptian Crisis (2011–2014)
Political parties established in 2011
Political party alliances in Egypt
Socialist parties in Egypt
Egypt